The 1816 United States presidential election in New Jersey took place between November 1 to December 4, 1816, as part of the 1816 United States presidential election. The state chose eight representatives, or electors to the Electoral College, who voted for President and Vice President.

During this election, New Jersey cast its eight electoral votes to Democratic Republican candidate and Secretary of State James Monroe.

See also
 United States presidential elections in New Jersey

References

New Jersey
1816
1816 New Jersey elections